The Oriental dollarbird (Eurystomus orientalis) is a bird of the roller family, so named because of the distinctive pale blue or white, coin-shaped spots on its wings. It can be found from Australia to Korea, Japan and India.

Taxonomy
The Oriental dollarbird was formally described by the Swedish naturalist Carl Linnaeus in 1766 in the twelfth edition of his Systema Naturae under the binomial name Coracias orientalis. Linnaeus based his description on "Le Rollier des Indes" that had been described and illustrated by the French zoologist Mathurin Jacques Brisson in 1760. The type locality is the island of Java in Indonesia. The Oriental dollarbird is now placed in the genus Eurystomus that was introduced in 1816 by the French ornithologist Louis Jean Pierre Vieillot.

A molecular phylogenetic study published in 2018 found that the azure dollarbird (Eurystomus azureus) was nested in a clade containing subspecies of the Oriental dollarbird. Formerly, some authorities have also considered the broad-billed roller and the azure dollarbird to have been subspecies of the oriental dollarbird.  The generic name derives from Ancient Greek eurustomos 'wide-mouthed' and the specific epithet is Latin orientalis 'eastern'. Alternate names for the oriental dollarbird include the Asian dollarbird, dark roller, dollar roller, dollarbird, eastern broad-billed roller and oriental broad-billed roller.

Ten subspecies are recognized: 
 E. o. cyanocollis - Vieillot, 1819: Found from the Himalayas through China to south-eastern Siberia, Korea and Japan
 E. o. orientalis - (Linnaeus, 1766): Found from the southern Himalayas to Indochina, the Malay Peninsula, Sumatra, Java, Borneo and the Philippines
 E. o. laetior - Sharpe, 1890: Found in south-western India
 E. o. gigas - Stresemann, 1913: Found on southern Andaman Islands
 E. o. irisi - Deraniyagala, 1951: Found in Sri Lanka
 E. o. oberholseri - Junge, 1936: Found on Simeulue (off north-western Sumatra)
 Australian roller (E. o. pacificus) - (Latham, 1801): Originally described as a separate species in the genus Coracias. Found on the Lesser Sunda Islands, northern and eastern Australia
 E. o. waigiouensis - Elliot, DG, 1871: Originally described as a separate species. Found on New Guinea, western Papuan islands, D'Entrecasteaux Islands and the Louisiade Archipelago
 E. o. crassirostris - Sclater, PL, 1869: Originally described as a separate species. Found in the Bismarck Archipelago
 E. o. solomonensis - Sharpe, 1890: Originally described as a separate species. Found in the Solomon Islands

Description
The oriental dollarbird has a length of up to 30 cm. It is dark brown but this is heavily washed with a bluish-green sheen on the back and wing coverts. Its belly and undertail coverts are light coloured, and it has glossy bright blue colouring on its throat and undertail. Its flight feathers are a darker blue. Its bill is short and wide and in mature animals is coloured orange-red with a black tip. It has very light blue patches on the outer parts of its wings which are highly visible in flight and for which it is named. The females are slightly duller than the males but overall the two are very similar. Immature birds are much duller than the adults and do not have the blue colouring on their throats. They also have brown bills and feet instead of the red of the adults.

Distribution and habitat
The oriental dollarbird is found from Australia to Japan and India. It breeds in northern and eastern Australia between the months of September and April and winters in New Guinea and nearby islands. The birds prefer open wooded areas with hollow-bearing trees to build nests in.

Behaviour and ecology 
The oriental dollarbird is most commonly seen singly with a distinctive upright silhouette on a bare branch high in a tree, from which it hawks for insects, returning to the same perch after a few seconds.

Gallery

References

Further reading

External links 

 BirdLife Species Factsheet
 Photos of dollarbirds from Australian Birdlife Photo Library
 Sound of burung Tiong Batu, Recording AV#13711. Malaysia: Sabah; Sepilok, Rainforest Discovery Centre (within 1km) (5.879, 117.946), recorded by Frank R. Lambert
 Birds in Backyards: Dollarbird
Photos, audio and video of oriental dollarbird from Cornell Lab of Ornithology's Macaulay Library

Oriental dollarbird
Birds of Southeast Asia
Birds of New Guinea
Birds of the Solomon Islands
Migratory birds (Eastern Hemisphere)
Oriental dollarbird
Articles containing video clips
Taxa named by Carl Linnaeus